Woolsey, Arkansas (formerly Woolseys, Arkansas) is an unincorporated community in Crawford Township, Washington County, Arkansas, United States. It is located on U.S. Route 71 between West Fork and Winslow. The community contains the Woolsey Cemetery and Brown Bluff (3WA10), and is the namesake of the Woolsey Bridge, all on the National Register of Historic Places.

References

Unincorporated communities in Washington County, Arkansas
Unincorporated communities in Arkansas